Ljubica Nenezić (born 15 January 1997) is a Montenegrin handball player for HC Gloria Buzău and the Montenegrin national team.

International honours
EHF Champions League: 
Semifinalist: 2016 

EHF Cup: 
Semifinalist: 2018

References

External links

1997 births
Living people
Montenegrin female handball players
Sportspeople from Podgorica
Olympic handball players of Montenegro
Handball players at the 2020 Summer Olympics
Expatriate handball players in Turkey
Montenegrin expatriate sportspeople in Hungary
Montenegrin expatriate sportspeople in Turkey
Montenegrin expatriate sportspeople in Romania
Mediterranean Games medalists in handball
Mediterranean Games silver medalists for Montenegro
Kastamonu Bld. SK (women's handball) players
Competitors at the 2018 Mediterranean Games